Bembina is a genus of tussock moths in the family Erebidae.

Walker circumscribed the genus in 1865 with his newly-described B. apicalis as its sole member.

Species
, the following six species are included in the genus.
Bembina albinotata (Heylaerts, 1892)
Bembina apicalis Walker, 1865
Bembina atripuncta (Hampson, 1897)
Bembina isabellina (Hampson, 1892)
Bembina nucula (Swinhoe, 1894)
Bembina pseudaurantiaca Holloway, 1999

References

Lymantriinae
Moth genera
Taxa named by Francis Walker (entomologist)